A Daughter of Dixie is an American silent film produced by Kalem Company and directed by Sidney Olcott with Gene Gauntier in the leading role. It is a story about the American Civil War.

Cast
 Gene Gauntier - Miss Betsy

External links

 A Daughter of Dixie website dedicated to Sidney Olcott

1910 films
Silent American drama films
American silent short films
Films set in Florida
Films shot in Jacksonville, Florida
Films directed by Sidney Olcott
1910 short films
1910 drama films
American black-and-white films
1910s American films